Gaius Turranius was a Roman eques who flourished during the reign of the emperors Augustus, and Tiberius. He was appointed to a series of imperial offices, most notably praefectus or governor of Roman Egypt and later praefectus annonae.

His home city was Gades (now Cádiz). In 7 BC Turranius was appointed to prefect of Egypt and held that position until 4 BC. One of his acts in office has survived: an edict ordering the registration of Egyptian priests and what services they provide so "I may make an examination of them. Those not of the priestly order shall be removed from office without delay." The Flight into Egypt of Mary, Joseph and Jesus, is thought to have taken place during his tenure.

Turranius is attested as praefectus annonae when Tiberius succeeded Augustus on the later's death in AD 14. He is attested again in that post in 48, during the reign of Claudius. According to Seneca the Younger, Caligula relieved him from that post on account of his great age, upon which Turranius ordered his family to mourn him as if he were dead; this only ended when Claudius restored him to his prefecture.

References

Further reading 
 Rudolf Hanslik, "Turranius II (1)", Der Kleine Pauly, Bande 5 (Stuttgart 1975), col. 1010.

1st-century BC Romans
1st-century Romans
1st-century BC Roman governors of Egypt
Roman governors of Egypt
Praefecti annonae